Nevada's 20th Senate district is one of 21 districts in the Nevada Senate. It has  been represented by Republican Keith Pickard since 2018, succeeding fellow Republican Michael Roberson.

Geography
District 20 covers the southern edge of the Las Vegas Valley in Clark County, including parts of Henderson, Paradise, and Enterprise.

The district is located entirely within Nevada's 3rd congressional district, and overlaps with the 22nd and 41st districts of the Nevada Assembly.

Recent election results
Nevada Senators are elected to staggered four-year terms; since 2012 redistricting, the 20th district has held elections in midterm years.

2018

2014

Federal and statewide results in District 20

References 

20
Clark County, Nevada